Patrie is a 1917 French film by Albert Capellani after the drama of Victorien Sardou. The film featured Henry Krauss as the Count of Rysoor, Paul Capellani as Karloo Van der Noot, Léon Bernard as Ionas, and Maxime Desjardins as the Duke of Alba.

References

External links

1917 films
French silent feature films
Films directed by Albert Capellani
French films based on plays
Films based on works by Victorien Sardou
Films set in the 16th century
Films set in Flanders
Works about the Eighty Years' War
Cultural depictions of Fernando Álvarez de Toledo, 3rd Duke of Alba
French black-and-white films
French drama films
1917 drama films
Silent drama films